Shienga (Shinga) is a village in East Mamprusi district, of the Northern Region of Ghana. It lies at an elevation of 349 meters near the right (southern) bank of the White Volta.

Notes

Populated places in the Northern Region (Ghana)